Extra Prolific was an American alternative hip hop duo formally signed to Jive Records. The duo composed of rapper Duane "Snupe" Lee and producer/DJ Michael "Mike G" Getmore and was a subgroup of the rap collective Hieroglyphics.

Extra Prolific was the Hieroglyphics' second group to splinter from the collective after the Souls of Mischief and like them, signed a deal with Jive Records.  The duo recorded their debut album Like It Should Be which was released in late in 1994. The album spawned a minor hit in "Brown Sugar". Mike G left the group while Snupe kept the Extra Prolific name and continued to release music under the name into 1998.

Snupe released a new album Like It's Supposed To Be under the Extra Prolific name in March 2020.

Discography

References

External links 
 Lee Majors on Youtube

Alternative hip hop groups
Hip hop groups from California
Musical groups from Oakland, California
Musical groups established in 1994
1994 establishments in California
American musical duos
Hip hop duos
Jive Records artists